Plotosaurus ("swimmer lizard") is an extinct genus of mosasaurs who lived during the Upper Cretaceous (Maastrichtian) in what is now North America. Only one species is recognized, P. bennisoni, described by Berkeley paleontologist Charles Lewis Camp in 1942 from fossils discovered in California. Originally named Kolposaurus (meaning "bay lizard"), it was changed to Plotosaurus in 1951 when Camp discovered that the name had already been assigned to a type of nothosaur. Unlike other mosasaurids, Plotosaurus possesses a morphology converging with those of ichthyosaurs, suggesting a much more advanced swimming adaptation than some of its close relatives.

Discovery and naming 

The earliest described specimens of Plotosaurus were discovered in the early 20th century from Moreno Formation deposits along the San Joaquin Valley, California. The first was a pair of caudal vertebrae collected during 1918 or 1920 by an Oakland resident named Herman G. Walker while exploring the Panoche Hills. They were donated to the University of California, Berkeley's Museum of Paleontology under the catalog UCMP 36050. In June 1936, a high school student from Gustine named Allan Bennison found three vertebrae next to a hadrosaur fossil in shale hills near Patterson, two of which he donated to UC Berkeley as UCMP 32943. Bennison was inspired to geology by his science teacher M. Merrill Thompson and continued to study the stratigraphy of surrounding hills. This would turn fruitful, as in 1937 he discovered a partial skeleton from grey sandstone hills near Pacheco Pass during a survey of Late Cretaceous beds in the Diablo Range. Bennison notified Thompson, and the two brought UC Berkeley paleontologists Samuel Paul Welles, Curtis J. Hesse, Owen J. Poe, and Thompson's students to excavate the find. The fossil consisted of a complete skull, eighteen articulated vertebrae, an interclavicle, four ribs, and rib fragments. It was curated to UC Berkeley's museum as UCMP 32778. In August of the same year, a second skeleton was collected by a joint UC Berkeley-California State University, Fresno party while excavating an elasmosaur fossil in the Panoche Hills around forty miles southeast of Bennison's skeleton. This skeleton, first found by Fresno State professor William M. Tucker, was far larger than Bennison's skeleton and consisted of an articulated series of fifty-four dorsal, pygal, and caudal vertebrae. It was sent to UC Berkeley as UCMP 33913. Field expeditions of the California Institute of Technology in Moreno Formation outcrops north of Coalinga between 1938 and 1940 uncovered three additional partial skeletons. The most complete, CIT 2750, consisted of a large skull, thirty-nine front vertebrae, a shoulder girdle, and front paddles, while the other two (CIT 2751 and 2755) preserved the mosasaurs' tails.

The fossil skeletons came under the study of the UC Berkeley's Museum of Paleontology director Charles Lewis Camp, who published his research in 1942. In it, he recognized that they represent a new genus of mosasaur. Camp particularly noticed the highly derived aquatic adaptations that were far more specialized than other mosasaurs, calling it "the most advanced genus yet described in the family Mosasauridae." He named this genus Kolposaurus, a portmanteau of the Ancient Greek words κόλπος (kólpos, "bay") and σαῦρος (saûros, "lizard"), and the type species Kolposaurus bennisoni in honor of Bennison with UCMP 32778 as its holotype. Camp (1942) also identified a second species which he named Kolposaurus tuckeri after Tucker. Its holotype was the same skeleton discovered by its namesake (UCMP 33913), differentiated from K. bennisoni by its larger size and more numerous pygal vertebrae. The Caltech skeletons were identified as K. tuckeri, albeit tentatively for CIT 2750. If its assignment was correct, this would have provided additional information to differentiate the species from K. bennisoni, namely in its less derived skull morphology as inferred by smaller and shorter nostrils, the frontal bone not being as extended backwards, less numerous pterygoid teeth, the quadrate being taller than it is wide, and a smaller pineal foramen; different counts of vertebrae bearing certain processes; and a larger interclavicle in proportion to the skull. In 1951, Camp discovered that the name Kolposaurus was preoccupied by a nothosaur, and so renamed the genus to Plotosaurus as a portmanteau of the Ancient Greek πλωτώ (plôtô, "swimmer") and σαῦρος.

A 2008 study by paleontologists Johan Lindgren, Michael Caldwell, and John Jagt redescribed Plotosaurus based on a reexamination of the specimens described by Camp (1942) and new fossils uncovered after it. They found that much of the traits though to differentiate between the two species were actually shared, and the remaining distinct features were likely the result of intraspecific variation. This rendered P. tuckeri a junior synonym of P. bennisoni, making the genus monotypic.

Description 

Plotosaurs possessed several adaptations to marine life not seen in other mosasaurs. Compared with their relatives, they had narrower flippers, large tail fins and a streamlined fusiform body shape. This design converges with the morphology and hydrodynamic build of ichthyosaurs. Some of the tail vertebrae are fused together; unlike in most mosasaurs this is not a pathological condition but another aquatic adaptation that allowed Plotosaurus to achieve a more efficient swimming design. Altogether, Plotosaurus possessed the highest level of aquatic adaptations in any mosasaur.
These features probably enabled them to also be one of the fastest of the mosasaurs. They also had relatively large eyes for keen eyesight, and impressions found with their fossils suggest that they had scaly skin.

Based on cladistic analysis, plotosaurs are considered to be the most derived branch of mosasaur evolution.

Notes

References 

 Hilton, R.P. 2003. Dinosaurs and Other Mesozoic Reptiles of California. Berkeley and Los Angeles: University of California Press, 356 pp. 
 Lindgren, J., Alwmark, C., Caldwell, M.W., and Fiorillo, A.R. 2009. Skin of the Cretaceous mosasaur Plotosaurus: implications for aquatic adaptations in giant marine reptiles. Biology Letters .

External links 
 Mosasauridae Translation and Pronunciation Guide 
 Natural History Museum of Los Angeles County 
 UCMP Paleontology Portal 

Mosasaurines
Mosasaurs of North America
Fossil taxa described in 1951
Taxa named by Charles Lewis Camp